The Vancouver version of the NWA Canadian Tag Team Championship was established in 1962 as the top tag team title in NWA All-Star Wrestling. The title held that status until late summer 1985, when the title was renamed the UWA Tag Team Championship upon All-Star Wrestling's departure as a member of the National Wrestling Alliance, aside from the period from June 1966 to December 1967, when the promotion had a version of the NWA World Tag Team Championship, which was abandoned after that time.

Title history

{{Professional wrestling title history middle
|number=35
|champion=Abdullah the Butcher and Armand Hussein
|reign=1
|date=
|days=
|location=Vancouver, BC
|event=NWA All-Star Show
|notes= 
|ref=<ref name=F4W0701>

See also
National Wrestling Alliance
National Wrestling Alliance championships
NWA All-Star Wrestling
NWA World Tag Team Championship (Vancouver version)
UWA Tag Team Championship

References

External links
 NWA Vancouver Canadian Tag Team Championship at Cagematch - The Internet Wrestling Database

National Wrestling Alliance championships
Tag team wrestling championships
Canadian professional wrestling championships
Professional wrestling in British Columbia